The qualifying rounds for the 1900–01 Football Association Challenge Cup (FA Cup for short), the 30th edition of the world's oldest association football competition, consisting of six rounds of matches played between September and December 1900. A total of 220 teams entered the tournament, 178 of which played in at least one qualifying stage. The 1900–01 FA Cup began on 22 September 1900 when 40 teams competed in the preliminary round and ended on 20 April 1901, when Southern League side Tottenham Hotspur became the only ever non-League club to win the competition.

Tournament calendar

Preliminary round

First qualifying round

Second qualifying round

Third qualifying round

Fourth qualifying round

Fifth qualifying round

References

Qualifying Rounds